Podberyozkin or Podberezkin is a Russian masculine surname, its feminine counterpart is Podberyozkina or Podberezkina. It may refer to
Alexey Podberezkin (born 1953), Russian politician
Vyacheslav Podberyozkin (born 1992), Russian football player

Russian-language surnames